Tigerstripe is the name of a group of camouflage patterns developed for close-range use in dense jungle during jungle warfare by the South Vietnamese Armed Forces and adopted in late 1962 to early 1963 by US Special Forces during the Vietnam War. During and after the Vietnam War, the pattern was adopted by several other Asian countries. It derives its name from its resemblance to a tiger's stripes and were simply called "tigers." It features narrow stripes that look like brush-strokes of green and brown, and broader brush-strokes of black printed over a lighter shade of olive or khaki. The brush-strokes interlock rather than overlap, as in French Lizard pattern (TAP47) from which it apparently derives. 

There are many variations; R.D. Johnson counted at least 19 different versions in early drafts of Tiger Patterns, his definitive work on the subject, although it is unclear if these are all different print patterns, or if they include color variations of a few different print patterns.

History

It is unclear who developed the first tigerstripe pattern, consisting of sixty-four (64) stripes. The French used a similar pattern (Lizard) in their war in Vietnam. After the French left Vietnam, the Republic of Vietnam Marine Division continued using the pattern, a variant of which was later adopted by Vietnamese Rangers (Biệt Động Quân) and Special Forces (Lực Lượng Đặc Biệt). When the United States began sending advisors to South Vietnam, USMAAG advisors attached to the ARVN were authorized to wear their Vietnamese unit's combat uniform with US insignia. Soon, many American special operations forces in the Vietnamese theater of operations wore the pattern, despite not always being attached to ARVN units: it became the visible trademark of Marine Corps Recon, Green Berets, LRRPs, SEALs, and other elite forces. 

Tigerstripe was never an official US-issue item. Personnel permitted to wear it at first had their camo fatigues custom-made by local tailors, with ARVN uniforms being too small for most Americans; for this reason there were many variations of the basic tigerstripe pattern. In 1963, Marine Corps Advisors and from 1964, 5th Special Forces Group of the Green Berets contracted with Vietnamese and other Southeast Asian producers to make fatigues and other items such as boonie hats using tigerstripe fabric. Being manufactured by different producers in places like Thailand, Korea and in Japan via Okinawa, there was a wide variety of patterns and color shade variations. They were made in both Asian and US sizes.

During the latter stages of the war, tigerstripe was gradually replaced in American reconnaissance units by the-then-new ERDL pattern, a predecessor of the woodland BDU pattern. The Special Forces-advised Civilian Irregular Defense Group (CIDG) used tigerstripes from 1963 until disbanded in 1971. Special Forces personnel wore tigerstripes when conducting operations with the CIDG.

Besides American and ARVN forces, Australian and New Zealand military personnel used tigerstripe uniforms while on advisory duty with the ARVN units. Personnel from the Australian Special Air Service Regiment and the New Zealand Special Air Service were the principal wearers of tigerstripe uniforms (and ERDL uniforms) in theater, while regular Australian and New Zealand troops wore the standard-issue olive drab green uniforms.

Outside of Vietnam, Thailand and Philippines have been the most prolific manufacturers of tiger stripe designs since the Vietnam War. The pattern became popular throughout the Middle East and South America as well.

The pattern was tested by the USMC prior to the adoption of MARPAT through the Scout Sniper Instructor School.

Users

Current
 : Used by Taliban forces.
 : Most purchased in 2008 in bulks for Australian Army soldiers acting in OPFOR roles.
 : Used by French Foreign Legion forces in French Guiana under the Army Jungle Warfare School.
 : Desert tigerstipes known to be used by Iraqi commandos.
 : Used by the Philippine Army Special Forces and the Philippine Navy SEALs or NAVSOCOM (Naval Special Operations Command).
 : Known to be used by the MVD and other Russian law enforcement agencies as the Kamyshovy risunok (sometimes known as Kamysh) or Tigr. OMON has used a variant known as Ten (Shadow Tiger). The Kamysh is based on Malaysian-made tiger stripe patterns adopted for Russian use.
 : Tiger camo being used by Bohdan Company.
 : Green and Desert Tiger Stripes used in Afghanistan by US Special Forces units. Used by Green Berets in OPFOR drills.

Former
 : Used by National Directorate of Security forces.
 : Australian Special Air Service Regiment (Vietnam War)
 : Used local copies made in Croatia by the Croatian National Guard.
 : Formerly used from 1970s to 1990s.
 : Formerly used in the 1970s.
 : Known to be used by the Special Action Force during the EDSA Revolution.
 : New Zealand Special Air Service (Vietnam War)
 : Known to be used by ARVN Rangers, CIDGs and Marines
 : Used by the Republic of China Marine Corps, being replaced by digital versions of the tigerstripe.
 : Used by Thai special forces units. One version of the pattern is made with darker camo dyes with a pale background color, known as Shadowtiger.
 : Known to be formerly used by Ukrainian Berkut forces prior to being disbanded.
 : Known to be used by American soldiers advising the ARVN. Formerly used by American commandos operating in Vietnam.

Non-State Actors
 Khmer People's National Liberation Front: Used Thai-made tigerstripe camos in the 1980s.
 Shan State Army: Known to be used in the 1980s.

See also
 Airman Battle Uniform

References

Sources

External links

 

Camouflage patterns
Military uniforms
Military equipment introduced in the 1960s